The Barrytown franchise, (sometimes referred to as The Barrytown Pentalogy), is an Irish comedy-drama media franchise centred on the Rabbittes, a working-class family from Barrytown, Dublin. It began in 1988 when Beacon Pictures and 20th Century Fox bought the rights to the 1987 novel The Commitments by Roddy Doyle shortly after it was published. The book was successful, as was Alan Parker's 1991 film adaptation. The film received cult status, and is regarded as one of the best Irish films ever made. In 1999, the British Film Institute ranked the film at number 38 on its list of the "100 best British films of the century", based on votes from 1,000 leading figures of the film industry.

A sequel novel, The Snapper, was published in 1990, followed by a film adaptation in 1993. A third novel, The Van, was published and shortlisted for the 1991 Booker Prize, followed by a film adaptation in 1996. Paddy Clarke Ha Ha Ha, a spin-off published in 1993 by Secker and Warburg, won the Booker Prize for that year, with an epilogue novel, The Guts, published in 2013. A musical and stage play based on the first two installments of the series have also been produced, ongoing from 2013 and 2018.

Films

The Commitments (1991)

Jimmy Rabbitte (Robert Arkins), a self-proclaimed promoter, decides to organize an R&B group to fill the musical void in his hometown of Dublin, Ireland. The band comes together but ends up consisting entirely of white musicians who have little experience with the genre. Even though their raw talent and lofty aspirations gain the group notoriety, the pitfalls of fame began to tear at their newfound friendships as they prepare for their big show. The film also stars Angeline Ball, Maria Doyle, Bronagh Gallagher, Glen Hansard, Andrew Strong, Colm Meaney, and Andrea Corr.

Many of the actors involved in The Commitments went on to pursue various acting and musical careers. Robert Arkins signed a record deal with MCA Records in 1993, although he did not finish recording the consequent album. He has produced work for a number of commercial clients, television projects, and composed music for two short films. Andrew Strong went on to produce several albums, which he described as having elements of R&B and rock. He has performed alongside The Rolling Stones, Elton John and Ray Charles, and formed his own band, The Bone Yard Boys, in 2003. In 1993, two of the film's cast members, Kenneth McCluskey and Dick Massey, formed their own tribute act band, The Stars from the Commitments. The 9-piece band has since played more than 1,000 shows worldwide, and has played with B.B. King, James Brown and Wilson Pickett.

The Commitments underperformed at the North American box office, grossing $14.9 million during its theatrical run. Reviewers praised the music, performances and humour, while criticism was occasionally aimed at the pacing and Parker's direction. The film resulted in two soundtrack albums released by MCA Records; the first reached #8 on the Billboard 200 album chart and achieved triple-platinum status, while the second album achieved gold sales status. At the 1992 British Academy Film Awards, the film won four of six BAFTA Awards for Best Film, Best Direction, Best Adapted Screenplay and Best Editing. It also received an Academy Award nomination for Best Film Editing.

The Snapper (1993)

Doyle was given creative freedom by the BBC over the adaptation of The Snapper, for which he wrote the screenplay. Lynda Myles returned to produce the film and hired Stephen Frears as its director. Colm Meaney also returned. The adaptation was originally planned as a television film, as an episode of the British television anthology drama series Screen Two, before Frears suggested that it be transferred to film. Doyle disagreed with the change, saying that he never liked to be made for the big screen, which he thought was grainy. The Snapper (1993) premiered at the 1993 Cannes Film Festival, where it received a standing ovation. It was a critical success, receiving largely positive reviews.

The sequel again features the Rabbitte family, but due to rights problems, the family surname in The Snapper was changed from 'Rabbitte' to 'Curley'. The film centres on Sharon Curley, the eldest daughter of the family, and her experience of unplanned teen pregnancy. The film also stars Brendan Gleeson, Pat Laffan, Ronan Wilmot, and Stanley Townsend.

The Van (1996)

For the film adaptation of The Van, Doyle and Myles formed their own production company, Deadly Films, and the author was given creative control over the selection of its cast and director. Frears returned as director, and Meaney was cast in the lead role. Although The Van (1996) premiered at the 1996 Cannes Film Festival to some favorable reviews, critical reaction was negative upon release; reviewers criticised the film for its thin material and lack of strong characterization.

The film deals with themes of unemployment and self-worth, as Brendan "Bimbo" Reeves (Donal O'Kelly) and Larry (Colm Meaney) cope with losing their jobs and embark on a partnership to sell fried food from the eponymous van. The film also stars Ger Ryan, Rúaidhrí Conroy, Brendan O'Carroll, Stuart Dunne, Marie Mullen, and Jon Kenny.

Mooted sequel
In January 2000, Harvey Weinstein acquired the film rights to The Commitments for Miramax and commissioned playwright Warren Leight to write a direct sequel to the film, with Cathy Konrad attached as a producer. The premise involved several members of The Commitments pairing with new band members before going on tour in the United States. The project subsequently entered development hell.

Novels

The Commitments (1988)

Following the 1988 publication of Roddy Doyle's novel The Commitments (1987) in the United Kingdom, producers Lynda Myles and Roger Randall-Cutler acquired the film rights, and asked Doyle to write an adaptation. Doyle, an inexperienced screenwriter, spent one year drafting the script, accompanied by Myles and Randall-Cutler. Although a script was completed, Myles felt it needed improvement, and passed the book on to Dick Clement and Ian La Frenais, hoping that they would suggest a more experienced writer. Upon reading the novel, Clement and La Frenais agreed to help write the script themselves.

The Snapper (1990)

The Snapper revolves around unmarried twenty-year-old Sharon Rabbitte's pregnancy, and the unexpected effects this has on her conservative, working class Dublin family.

The Van (1991)

The Van focuses on the elder Jimmy Rabbitte and his efforts at going into business with his best friend Bimbo, after both lose their jobs. It was shortlisted for the Booker Prize (1991).

Paddy Clarke Ha Ha Ha (1993)

Paddy Clarke Ha Ha Ha is a novel written by Roddy Doyle. It is a spin-off following one year in the life of a Dublin ten-year-old, Patrick "Paddy" Clarke, as he explores Barrytown through his parents' divorce, encountering various characters from the Barrytown series of novels.

The Guts (2013)

Set 30 years later, The Guts follows the younger Jimmy Rabbitte as he is suffering from bowel cancer. The novel was named Novel of the Year at the 2013 Irish Book Awards.

Short stories
Throughout the early 2010s, Doyle frequently posted short comic dialogues on his Facebook page between two older men in a Barrytown pub, often relating to current events in Ireland (such as the 2015 marriage referendum) and further afield. These developed into the novella short story collection Two Pints in 2012 and Two More Pints in 2014.

Cast and crew

Principal cast
 A dark gray cell indicates the character was not featured in the film.
 A  indicates an appearance through a photographic still.
 An indicates an appearance through the use of an actor or actress's facial likeness.
 A  indicates a performance through voice-over work.
 A  indicates a cameo appearance.

The surname of the Rabbitte family was changed to the maiden name of Curley for the film adaptations of The Snapper and The Van, as 20th Century Fox owns the rights to the Rabbitte name from The Commitments, who were not involved in the adaptations of subsequent works in the trilogy.

Additional crew

Musical

Doyle's novel The Commitments and its 1991 film adaptation inspired a 2013 musical stage production, directed by British theatre director Jamie Lloyd. Following the film's success, Doyle had previously turned down offers to adapt his novel into a stage production. The Commitments began previews on 21 September 2013 in London's West End at the Palace Theatre, before its official opening night on 8 October. The show had more than 1,000 performances before officially closing in London on 1 November 2015. The United Kingdom and Ireland tour commenced in 2017.

Stage play
In 2018, the Gate Theatre commissioned Doyle to write a stage adaptation of The Snapper. The show was directed by Róisín McBrinn and was revived in 2019.

Reception

Box office performance

Critical and public response

Accolades

Legacy
An image of four of the actors of the original film, in character, was featured on an Irish postage stamp as part of the Ireland 1996: Irish Cinema Centenary series issued by An Post; the image includes lead singer Deco Cuffe (Andrew Strong), along with the three "Commitmentettes" – Imelda Quirke (Angeline Ball), Natalie Murphy (Maria Doyle Kennedy) and Bernie McGloughlin (Bronagh Gallagher).

Music

Soundtracks

Family members
 James "Jimmy" Rabbitte, Sr. – the patriarch and protagonist of the third Barrytown novel, The Van, in which he and a friend, Brendan "Bimbo" Reeves, buy a chipper van as a business opportunity during the 1990 World Cup.
 Veronica Rabbitte – the matriarch of the family who tries to keep the peace and is often known to have a laugh at her family's antics.
 Sharon Rabbitte – the eldest daughter and the protagonist of the second novel, The Snapper, in which she comes to terms with her pregnancy and later gives birth to a daughter, Georgina (whom the family call "Gina" for short).
 Georgina "Gina" Rabbitte – sharon's daughter, born in The Snapper and featured as a toddler in The Van, often repeating in baby talk the profanity used by family members.
 James "Jimmy" Rabbitte, Jr. – the eldest son and protagonist of the first novel, The Commitments, in which he and several friends form an Irish soul band. In The Snapper, Jimmy frequently practices being a DJ, much to the predictable annoyance of his father. In the third novel, he has moved out of home and is living with his girlfriend but still makes frequent visits home, while in The Guts, he is married with four children, and suffering from bowel cancer.
 Leslie Rabbitte – the second-born son of Jimmy Sr. and Veronica. The least prominent of the children, he is almost never at home in the trilogy. Leslie is frequently in trouble and clashes with his father.
 Darren Rabbitte – the youngest son, still at school. He decides to become a vegetarian in The Van yet helps Jimmy Sr. with his business.
 Tracy and Linda Rabbitte – the two youngest children, twin girls, who frequently behave mischievously, provoking the ire of the parents.
 Larrygogan – a dog who becomes the family's pet in The Snapper.

References

External links

 

20th-century Irish novels
Book series introduced in 1987
Comedy film franchises
Musical film series
Novels by Roddy Doyle
Novel series
Novels set in Dublin (city)
Literary trilogies
Mass media franchises introduced in 1988